Kirovo-Chepetsky District is an administrative and municipal district (raion), one of the thirty-nine in Kirov Oblast, Russia. It is located in the center of the oblast. Its administrative center is the town of Kirovo-Chepetsk (which is not administratively a part of the district). Population:  22,193 (2002 Census);

Administrative and municipal status
Within the framework of administrative divisions, Kirovo-Chepetsky District is one of the thirty-nine in the oblast. The town of Kirovo-Chepetsk serves as its administrative center, despite being incorporated separately as an administrative unit with the status equal to that of the districts.

As a municipal division, the district is incorporated as Kirovo-Chepetsky Municipal District. The Town of Kirovo-Chepetsk is incorporated separately from the district as Kirovo-Chepetsk Urban Okrug.

References

Notes

Sources

Districts of Kirov Oblast
